Jael and Sisera are the Biblical figures from the Hebrew Bible, where Jael kills Sisera.

Jael and Sisera may also refer to:

Art
Jael and Sisera (Artemisia Gentileschi)
Jael and Sisera, a 1787 painting by James Northcote (1746–1831) 
Jael and Sisera, c. 1659–60, pen and brown ink Rembrandt
Jael and Sisera, Nicolas Poussin
Jael and Sisera, Speckaert

Other
Jael and Sisera (film), a 1911 short film